The 2016 IIHF World Championship Division II was an international ice hockey tournament run by the International Ice Hockey Federation. Group A was contested in Jaca, Spain and Group B in Mexico City, Mexico on 9–15 April 2016.

Venues

Group A tournament

Participants

Match officials
4 referees and 7 linesmen were selected for the tournament.

Referees
 Eduard Ibatulin
 Przemysław Kepa
 Yuri Oskirko
 Rasmus Toppel

Linesmen
 Sergio Biec
 Daniel Hynek
 Lukáš Kacej
 Rudy Meyer
 Attila Nagy
 Emil Yletyinen
 Viktor Zinchenko

Standings

Results
All times are local (UTC+2).

Awards and statistics

Awards
Best players selected by the directorate:
Best Goalkeeper:  Ander Alcaine
Best Defenseman:  Erik Tummers
Best Forward:  Ben Van den Bogaert
Source: IIHF.com

Scoring leaders
List shows the top skaters sorted by points, then goals.

GP = Games played; G = Goals; A = Assists; Pts = Points; +/− = Plus/minus; PIM = Penalties in minutes; POS = Position
Source: IIHF.com

Goaltending leaders
Only the top five goaltenders, based on save percentage, who have played at least 40% of their team's minutes, are included in this list.

TOI = Time on ice (minutes:seconds); SA = Shots against; GA = Goals against; GAA = Goals against average; Sv% = Save percentage; SO = Shutouts
Source: IIHF.com

Group B tournament

Participants

Match officials
4 referees and 6 linesmen were selected for the tournament.

Referees
 Martin de Wilde
 Miklós Haszonits
 Mario Maillet
 Stephen Thomson

Linesmen
 William Hancock
 Michael Harrington
 James Kavanagh
 Jos Korte
 Sem Ramírez
 Maarten Van den Acker

Standings

Results
All times are local (UTC−5).

Awards and statistics

Awards
Best players selected by the directorate:
Best Goalkeeper:  Anthony Kimlin
Best Defenseman:  Paul Baranzelli
Best Forward:  Héctor Majul
Source: IIHF.com

Scoring leaders

List shows the top skaters sorted by points, then goals.

GP = Games played; G = Goals; A = Assists; Pts = Points; +/− = Plus/minus; PIM = Penalties in minutes; POS = Position
Source: IIHF.com

Goaltending leaders
Only the top five goaltenders, based on save percentage, who have played at least 40% of their team's minutes, are included in this list.

TOI = Time on ice (minutes:seconds); SA = Shots against; GA = Goals against; GAA = Goals against average; Sv% = Save percentage; SO = Shutouts
Source: IIHF.com

References

2016
Division II
2016 IIHF World Championship Division II
International ice hockey competitions hosted by Mexico
IIHF World Championship Division II
IIHF World Championship Division II
IIHF World Championship Division II
2016 IIHF World Championship Division II
2010s in Mexico City
April 2016 sports events in Mexico
April 2016 sports events in Spain